Andronicus of Cyrrhus or Andronicus Cyrrhestes (Andrónikos Kyrrhēstou), son of Hermias, was a Greek astronomer best known as the architect of the horologion at Athens called the Tower of the Winds. Andronicus also built a multifaced sundial in the sanctuary of Poseidon on the Greek island of Tinos. He flourished about 100 BC.

Life
He built a horologion at Athens, the so-called Tower of the Winds, a considerable portion of which still exists. It is octagonal, with figures carved on each side, representing the eight principal winds. In antiquity a bronze figure of Triton on the summit, with a rod in his hand, turned round by the wind, pointed to the quarter from which it blew. From this model is derived the custom of placing weather cocks  on steeples.

Notes

References

External links
Tenos island - Epigraphical Database - IG XII,5 891

Ancient Greek astronomers
Ancient Macedonian scientists
Ancient Macedonians in Athens
Roman-era Macedonians
2nd-century BC births
1st-century BC deaths
Year of birth unknown
Year of death unknown
2nd-century BC astronomers